Acetyl-CoA (acetyl coenzyme A) is a molecule that participates in many biochemical reactions in protein, carbohydrate and lipid metabolism. Its main function is to deliver the acetyl group to the citric acid cycle (Krebs cycle) to be oxidized for energy production. Coenzyme A (CoASH or CoA) consists of a β-mercaptoethylamine group linked to the vitamin pantothenic acid (B5) through an amide linkage and 3'-phosphorylated ADP. The acetyl group (indicated in blue in the structural diagram on the right) of acetyl-CoA is linked to the sulfhydryl substituent of the β-mercaptoethylamine group. This thioester linkage is a "high energy" bond, which is particularly reactive. Hydrolysis of the thioester bond is exergonic (−31.5 kJ/mol).

CoA is acetylated to acetyl-CoA by the breakdown of carbohydrates through glycolysis and by the breakdown of fatty acids through β-oxidation. Acetyl-CoA then enters the citric acid cycle, where the acetyl group is oxidized to carbon dioxide and water, and the energy released is captured in the form of 11 ATP and one GTP per acetyl group. GTP is the equivalent of ATP and they can be interconverted by Nucleoside-diphosphate kinase.

Konrad Bloch and Feodor Lynen were awarded the 1964 Nobel Prize in Physiology and Medicine for their discoveries linking acetyl-CoA and fatty acid metabolism. Fritz Lipmann won the Nobel Prize in 1953 for his discovery of the cofactor coenzyme A.

Direct synthesis 
The acetylation of CoA is determined by the carbon sources.

Extramitochondrial 
 At high glucose levels, glycolysis takes place rapidly, thus increasing the amount of citrate produced from the tricarboxylic acid cycle. This citrate is then exported to other organelles outside the mitochondria to be broken into acetyl-CoA and oxaloacetate by the enzyme ATP citrate lyase (ACL). This principal reaction is coupled with the hydrolysis of ATP.
 At low glucose levels:
 CoA is acetylated using acetate by acetyl-CoA synthetase (ACS), also coupled with ATP hydrolysis.
 Ethanol also serves as a carbon source for acetylation of CoA utilizing the enzyme alcohol dehydrogenase.
 Degradation of branched-chain ketogenic amino acids such as valine, leucine, and isoleucine occurs. These amino acids are converted to α-ketoacids by transamination and eventually to isovaleryl-CoA through oxidative decarboxylation by an α-ketoacid dehydrogenase complex. Isovaleryl-CoA undergoes dehydrogenation, carboxylation and hydration to form another CoA-derivative intermediate before it is cleaved into acetyl-CoA and acetoacetate.

Intramitochondrial 

 At high glucose levels, acetyl-CoA is produced through glycolysis. Pyruvate undergoes oxidative decarboxylation in which it loses its carboxyl group (as carbon dioxide) to form acetyl-CoA, giving off 33.5 kJ/mol of energy. The oxidative conversion of pyruvate into acetyl-CoA is referred to as the pyruvate dehydrogenase reaction. It is catalyzed by the pyruvate dehydrogenase complex.  Other conversions between pyruvate and acetyl-CoA are possible.  For example, pyruvate formate lyase disproportionates pyruvate into acetyl-CoA and formic acid.

 At low glucose levels, the production of acetyl-CoA is linked to β-oxidation of fatty acids. Fatty acids are first converted to acyl-CoA. Acyl-CoA is then degraded in a four-step cycle of oxidation, hydration, oxidation and thiolysis catalyzed by four respective enzymes, namely acyl-CoA dehydrogenase, enoyl-CoA hydratase, 3-hydroxyacyl-CoA dehydrogenase, and thiolase. The cycle produces a new fatty acid chain with two fewer carbons and acetyl-CoA as a byproduct.

Functions

Intermediates in various pathways 
 In Cellular Respiration
 Citric acid cycle:
 Through a series of chemical reactions, stored energy is released through the oxidation of acetyl-CoA derived from carbohydrates, fats, and proteins into adenosine triphosphate (ATP) and carbon dioxide.
 Fatty acid metabolism
 Acetyl-CoA is produced by the breakdown of both carbohydrates (by glycolysis) and lipids (by β-oxidation). It then enters the citric acid cycle in the mitochondrion by combining with oxaloacetate to form citrate.
 Two acetyl-CoA molecules condense to form acetoacetyl-CoA, which gives rise to the formation of acetoacetate and β-hydroxybutyrate. Acetoacetate, β-hydroxybutyrate, and their spontaneous breakdown product acetone are frequently, but confusingly, known as ketone bodies (as they are not "bodies" at all, but water-soluble chemical substances). The ketone bodies are released by the liver into the blood. All cells with mitochondria can take ketone bodies up from the blood and reconvert them into acetyl-CoA, which can then be used as fuel in their citric acid cycles, as no other tissue can divert its oxaloacetate into the gluconeogenic pathway in the way that the liver does. Unlike free fatty acids, ketone bodies can cross the blood–brain barrier and are therefore available as fuel for the cells of the central nervous system, acting as a substitute for glucose, on which these cells normally survive. The occurrence of high levels of ketone bodies in the blood during starvation, a low-carbohydrate diet, prolonged heavy exercise, and uncontrolled type-1 diabetes mellitus is known as ketosis, and in its extreme form in out-of-control type-1 diabetes mellitus, as ketoacidosis.
 On the other hand, when the insulin concentration in the blood is high, and that of glucagon is low (i.e. after meals), the acetyl-CoA produced by glycolysis condenses as normal with oxaloacetate to form citrate in the mitochondrion. However, instead of continuing through the citric acid cycle to be converted to carbon dioxide and water, the citrate is removed from the mitochondrion into the cytoplasm. There it is cleaved by ATP citrate lyase into acetyl-CoA and oxaloacetate. The oxaloacetate is returned to the mitochondrion as malate (and then converted back into oxaloacetate to transfer more acetyl-CoA out of the mitochondrion). This cytosolic acetyl-CoA can then be used to synthesize fatty acids through carboxylation by acetyl-CoA carboxylase into malonyl CoA, the first committed step in the synthesis of fatty acids. This conversion occurs primarily in the liver, adipose tissue and lactating mammary glands, where the fatty acids are combined with glycerol to form triglycerides, the major fuel reservoir of most animals. Fatty acids are also components of the phospholipids that make up the bulk of the lipid bilayers of all cellular membranes.
 In plants, de novo fatty acid synthesis occurs in the plastids. Many seeds accumulate large reservoirs of seed oils to support germination and early growth of the seedling before it is a net photosynthetic organism.
 The cytosolic acetyl-CoA can also condense with acetoacetyl-CoA to form 3-hydroxy-3-methylglutaryl-CoA (HMG-CoA) which is the rate-limiting step controlling the synthesis of cholesterol. Cholesterol can be used as is, as a structural component of cellular membranes, or it can be used to synthesize steroid hormones, bile salts, and vitamin D.
 Acetyl-CoA can be carboxylated in the cytosol by acetyl-CoA carboxylase, giving rise to malonyl-CoA, a substrate required for synthesis of flavonoids and related polyketides, for elongation of fatty acids to produce waxes, cuticle, and seed oils in members of the Brassica family, and for malonation of proteins and other phytochemicals. In plants, these include sesquiterpenes, brassinosteroids (hormones), and membrane sterols.
 Steroid synthesis:
 Acetyl-CoA participates in the mevalonate pathway by partaking in the synthesis of hydroxymethyl glutaryl-CoA.
 Acetylcholine synthesis:
 Acetyl-CoA is also an important component in the biogenic synthesis of the neurotransmitter acetylcholine. Choline, in combination with acetyl-CoA, is catalyzed by the enzyme choline acetyltransferase to produce acetylcholine and coenzyme A as a byproduct.
 Melatonin synthesis
 Acetylation 
 Acetyl-CoA is also the source of the acetyl group incorporated onto certain lysine residues of histone and nonhistone proteins in the posttranslational modification acetylation. This acetylation is catalyzed by acetyltransferases. This acetylation affects cell growth, mitosis, and apoptosis.
Allosteric regulator
 Acetyl-CoA serves as an allosteric regulator of pyruvate dehydrogenase kinase (PDK). It regulates through the ratio of acetyl-CoA versus CoA. Increased concentration of acetyl-CoA activates PDK.    
 Acetyl-CoA is also an allosteric activator of pyruvate carboxylase.

Interactive pathway map
Click on genes, proteins and metabolites below to visit Gene Wiki pages and related Wikipedia articles. The pathway can be downloaded and edited at WikiPathways.

See also
 Malonyl-CoA decarboxylase

References

External links
 

Cholinergics
Metabolism
Thioesters of coenzyme A
Glycolysis